Voice of Nation Coalition (also translated the People's Voice or Nation's Voice) was an electoral list for Iranian 2012 and 2016 legislative elections, led by Ali Motahari.

Political stance 
The list was originally called "Government Critics Front", as their stance was against Ahmadinejad Government for 2012 election. It was later renamed as Voice of Nation.

The group is self-proclaimed principlist, as it states in a statement published February 2012 it is "proud to be affiliated with the principlism, although we are critical of some principlists". It has been described as a "a slate of moderate conservatives" and "a moderate conservative tendency which includes dissident deputies campaigning on a more reformist platform, stressing the rights of the people and freedom of speech within the constitution". According to Anoushiravan Ehteshami, the group is a "parliamentary list of middle-of-the-road conservatives... which tried to form a bridge between the two poles [i.e. Reformists and Principlists]".

The group's leader, Ali Motahari believes that there are shortcomings in both principlist and reformist camps and has called for the removal of the "artificial wall" between the two.

Their lists features a combination of reformist and principlist candidates.

The group has been a supporter of Government of Hassan Rouhani and the nuclear talks.

Voice of Nation posters consist of stylized pictures of constitutional MP Hassan Modarres.

Election results

Parliament

Tehran City Council

See also 
:Category:Voice of Nation politicians

Notes

References

External links 
Electoral lists 
 2012 Parliamentary elections
 2013 City Council of Tehran election
 2016 Parliamentary elections

Principlist political groups in Iran
Political parties established in 2012
Electoral lists for Iranian legislative election, 2012
Electoral lists for Iranian legislative election, 2016
2012 establishments in Iran